Tirurangadi Muslim Orphanage is an educational hub of ten educational organizations situated in and around Tirurangadi town in Malappuram district, Kerala, India. 
P.S.M.O.College is the biggest campus in the entire group.

Location
The orphanage and other educational institutions are located at Saudabad in Tirurangadi, Malappuram District.

History
The Noorul Islamic Madrasa was established in 1939 followed by the Oriental Higher Secondary School in 1955.  The famous philanthropist M.K.Haji Sahib donated land for the orphanage and the Orphanage L.P.School was established in 1960.  P.S.M.O. College was established in 1968.   
The Orphanage helped to relocate 114 orphans whose parents died in an outbreak of cholera in Malabar in 1943.

Campus members
 Pocker Sahib Memorial Orphanage College
 Tirurangadi Yatheem Khana
 Noorul Islam Madrasa
 KMMMO Arabic College
 Orphanage U.P.School
 Oriental Higher Secondary School 
 SSMO Teacher Training Institute
 Orphanage I.T.Center
 MKH Orphanage Hospital 
 MKH School of Nursing

See also
 PSMO College 
 Tirurangadi

References

Education in Malappuram district
Islam in Kerala
Institutes of higher Islamic learning in Kerala